Peperomia micromerioides is a species of plant in the family Piperaceae. It is endemic to Ecuador.

References

	

Flora of Ecuador
litana
Critically endangered plants
Taxonomy articles created by Polbot